1st Prince was an electoral district in the Canadian province of Prince Edward Island, which elected two members to the Legislative Assembly of Prince Edward Island from 1873 to 1993.

The district comprised the westernmost portion of Prince County. Communities in the district included Alberton and Tignish.

When the provincial electoral districts were reorganized into conventional single-member districts in 1996, 1st Prince was replaced by the districts of Tignish-DeBlois, Alberton-Miminegash and West Point-Bloomfield.

Members

Dual member

Assemblyman-Councillor

Prince 1
1873 establishments in Prince Edward Island
1996 disestablishments in Prince Edward Island